Bellida is a monotypic genus of flowering plants in the aster family, Asteraceae, containing the single species Bellida graminea. It is native to Western Australia. Its common name is rosy bellida.

References

Monotypic Asteraceae genera
Eudicots of Western Australia
Gnaphalieae